The Beat Generation was a literary subculture movement started by a group of authors whose work explored and influenced American culture and politics in the post-war era. The bulk of their work was published and popularized by Silent Generationers in the 1950s, better known as Beatniks. The central elements of Beat culture are the rejection of standard narrative values, making a spiritual quest, the exploration of American and Eastern religions, the rejection of economic materialism, explicit portrayals of the human condition, experimentation with psychedelic drugs, and sexual liberation and exploration.

Allen Ginsberg's Howl (1956), William S. Burroughs' Naked Lunch (1959), and Jack Kerouac's On the Road (1957) are among the best known examples of Beat literature. Both Howl and Naked Lunch were the focus of obscenity trials that ultimately helped to liberalize publishing in the United States. The members of the Beat Generation developed a reputation as new bohemian hedonists, who celebrated non-conformity and spontaneous creativity.

The core group of Beat Generation authors—Herbert Huncke, Ginsberg, Burroughs, Lucien Carr, and Kerouac—met in 1944 in and around the Columbia University campus in New York City. Later, in the mid-1950s, the central figures, with the exception of Burroughs and Carr, ended up together in San Francisco, where they met and became friends of figures associated with the San Francisco Renaissance.

In the 1950s, a Beatnik subculture formed around the literary movement, although this was often viewed critically by major authors of the Beat movement. In the 1960s, elements of the expanding Beat movement were incorporated into the hippie and larger counterculture movements. Neal Cassady, as the driver for Ken Kesey's bus Furthur, was the primary bridge between these two generations. Ginsberg's work also became an integral element of early 1960s hippie culture, in which he actively participated. The hippie culture was practiced primarily by older members of the following generation.

Origin of name 
Although Kerouac introduced the phrase "Beat Generation" in 1948 to characterize a perceived underground, anti-conformist youth movement in New York, fellow poet Herbert Huncke is credited with first using the word "beat". The name arose in a conversation with writer John Clellon Holmes. Kerouac allows that it was Huncke, a street hustler, who originally used the phrase "beat", in an earlier discussion with him. The adjective "beat" could colloquially mean "tired" or "beaten down" within the African-American community of the period and had developed out of the image "beat to his socks", but Kerouac appropriated the image and altered the meaning to include the connotations "upbeat", "beatific", and the musical association of being "on the beat", and "the Beat to keep" from the Beat Generation poem.

Significant places

Columbia University 
The origins of the Beat Generation can be traced to Columbia University and the meeting of Kerouac, Ginsberg, Carr, Hal Chase and others. Kerouac attended Columbia on a football scholarship. Though the beats are usually regarded as anti-academic, many of their ideas were formed in response to professors like Lionel Trilling and Mark Van Doren. Classmates Carr and Ginsberg discussed the need for a "New Vision" (a term borrowed from W. B. Yeats), to counteract what they perceived as their teachers' conservative, formalistic literary ideals.

Times Square "underworld" 

Ginsberg was arrested in 1949. The police attempted to stop Ginsberg while he was driving with Huncke, his car filled with stolen items that Huncke planned to fence. Ginsberg crashed the car while trying to flee and escaped on foot, but left incriminating notebooks behind. He was given the option to plead insanity to avoid a jail term, and was committed for 90 days to Bellevue Hospital, where he met Carl Solomon.

Solomon was arguably more eccentric than psychotic. A fan of Antonin Artaud, he indulged in self-consciously "crazy" behavior, like throwing potato salad at a college lecturer on Dadaism. Solomon was given shock treatments at Bellevue; this became one of the main themes of Ginsberg's "Howl", which was dedicated to Solomon. Solomon later became the publishing contact who agreed to publish Burroughs' first novel, Junkie, in 1953.

Greenwich Village 
Beat writers and artists flocked to Greenwich Village in New York City in the late 1950s because of low rent and the "small town" element of the scene. Folksongs, readings and discussions often took place in Washington Square Park. Allen Ginsberg was a big part of the scene in the Village, as was Burroughs, who lived at 69 Bedford Street.

Burroughs, Ginsberg, Kerouac, and other poets frequented many bars in the area, including the San Remo Cafe at 93 MacDougal Street on the northwest corner of Bleecker, Chumley's, and Minetta Tavern. Jackson Pollock, Willem de Kooning, Franz Kline, and other abstract expressionists were also frequent visitors of and collaborators with the Beats. Cultural critics have written about the transition of Beat culture in the Village into the Bohemian hippie culture of the 1960s.

In 1960, a presidential election year, the Beats formed a political party, the "Beat Party," and held a mock nominating convention to announce a presidential candidate: the African-American street poet Big Brown, won a majority of votes on the first ballot but fell short of the eventual nomination.  The Associated Press reported, "Big Brown's lead startled the convention. Big, as the husky African American is called by his friends, wasn't the favorite son of any delegation, but he had one tactic that apparently earned him votes. In a chatterbox convention, only once did he speak at length, and that was to read his poetry."

San Francisco and the Six Gallery reading 

Ginsberg had visited Neal and Carolyn Cassady in San Jose, California in 1954 and moved to San Francisco in August. He fell in love with Peter Orlovsky at the end of 1954 and began writing Howl. Lawrence Ferlinghetti, of the new City Lights Bookstore, started to publish the City Lights Pocket Poets Series in 1955.

Kenneth Rexroth's apartment became a Friday night literary salon (Ginsberg's mentor William Carlos Williams, an old friend of Rexroth, had given him an introductory letter). When asked by Wally Hedrick to organize the Six Gallery reading, Ginsberg wanted Rexroth to serve as master of ceremonies, in a sense to bridge generations.

Philip Lamantia, Michael McClure, Philip Whalen, Ginsberg and Gary Snyder read on October 7, 1955, before 100 people (including Kerouac, up from Mexico City). Lamantia read poems of his late friend John Hoffman. At his first public reading Ginsberg performed the just finished first part of Howl. It was a success and the evening led to many more readings by the now locally famous Six Gallery poets.

It was also a marker of the beginning of the Beat movement, since the 1956 publication of Howl (City Lights Pocket Poets, no. 4) and its obscenity trial in 1957 brought it to nationwide attention.

The Six Gallery reading informs the second chapter of Kerouac's 1958 novel The Dharma Bums, whose chief protagonist is "Japhy Ryder", a character who is actually based on Gary Snyder. Kerouac was impressed with Snyder and they were close for a number of years. In the spring of 1955 they lived together in Snyder's cabin in Mill Valley, California. Most Beats were urbanites and they found Snyder almost exotic, with his rural background and wilderness experience, as well as his education in cultural anthropology and Oriental languages. Lawrence Ferlinghetti called him "the Thoreau of the Beat Generation."

As documented in the conclusion of The Dharma Bums, Snyder moved to Japan in 1955, in large measure in order to intensively practice and study Zen Buddhism. He would spend most of the next 10 years there. Buddhism is one of the primary subjects of The Dharma Bums, and the book undoubtedly helped to popularize Buddhism in the West and remains one of Kerouac's most widely read books.

Pacific Northwest 
The Beats also spent time in the Northern Pacific Northwest including Washington and Oregon. Kerouac wrote about sojourns to Washington's North Cascades in The Dharma Bums and On the Road.

Reed College in Portland, Oregon was also a locale for some of the Beat poets. Gary Snyder studied anthropology there, Philip Whalen attended Reed, and Allen Ginsberg held multiple readings on the campus around 1955 and 1956. Gary Snyder and Philip Whalen were students in Reed's calligraphy class taught by Lloyd J. Reynolds.

Significant figures 

Burroughs was introduced to the group by David Kammerer. Carr had befriended Ginsberg and introduced him to Kammerer and Burroughs. Carr also knew Kerouac's girlfriend Edie Parker, through whom Burroughs met Kerouac in 1944.

On August 13, 1944, Carr killed Kammerer with a Boy Scout knife in Riverside Park in what he claimed later was self-defense. He waited,  then dumped the body in the Hudson River, later seeking advice from Burroughs, who suggested he turn himself in. He then went to Kerouac, who helped him dispose of the weapon.

Carr turned himself in the following morning and later pleaded guilty to manslaughter. Kerouac was charged as an accessory, and Burroughs as a material witness, but neither were prosecuted. Kerouac wrote about this incident twice in his own works: once in his first novel, The Town and the City, and again in one of his last, Vanity of Duluoz. He wrote a collaboration novel with Burroughs, And the Hippos Were Boiled in Their Tanks, concerning the murder.

Participants

Women 
Beat Generation women who have been published include Edie Parker; Joyce Johnson; Carolyn Cassady; Hettie Jones; Joanne Kyger; Harriet Sohmers Zwerling; Diane DiPrima; and Ruth Weiss, who also made films. Carolyn Cassady wrote her own detailed account about life with husband Neal Cassady which also included details about her affair with Jack Kerouac. She titled it Off the Road, and it was published in 1990. Poet Elise Cowen took her own life in 1963. Poet Anne Waldman was less influenced by the Beats than by Allen Ginsberg's later turn to Buddhism. Later, female poets emerged who claimed to be strongly influenced by the Beats, including Janine Pommy Vega in the 1960s, Patti Smith in the 1970s, and Hedwig Gorski in the 1980s.

African Americans 
Although African Americans were not widely represented in the Beat Generation, the presence of some black writers in this movement did contribute to the movement's progression. While many of the Beats briefly discussed issues of race and sexuality, they spoke from their own perspectives—most being white. However, black people added a counterbalance to this; their work supplied readers with alternative views of occurrences in the world. Beats like the poet Robert "Bob" Kaufman and the writer LeRoi Jones (Amiri Baraka) provide through their work distinctly Black perspectives on the movement. Kaufman wrote about a number of his experiences with the racist institutions of the time. Following his time in the military, he had trouble with police officers and the criminal justice system. Like many of the Beats, Kaufman was also a fan of Jazz and incorporated it into his work to describe relationships with others. LeRoi Jones (Amiri Baraka) married Beat writer, Hettie Cohen, who became Hettie Jones, in 1958. Together with Diane di Prima, they worked to develop Yūgen magazine, named for the Japanese concept of yūgen. Mr. and Mrs. Jones were associated with a number of Beats (Jack Kerouac, Allen Ginsberg, and Gregory Corso). That is, until the assassination of the Civil Rights leader, Malcolm X. During this time, LeRoi Jones branched off from the other Beat writers, including his wife, to find his identity among the African-American and Islamic communities. The change in his social setting along with awakening influenced his writing and brought about the development of many of his most notable works, like Somebody Blew Up America, in which he reflected on the attacks of 9/11 and America's reaction to this incident in relation to other occurrences in America.

Culture and influences

Sexuality 
One of the key beliefs and practices of the Beat Generation was free love and sexual liberation, which strayed from the Christian ideals of American culture at the time. Some Beat writers were openly gay or bisexual, including two of the most prominent (Ginsberg and Burroughs). However, the first novel does show Cassady as frankly promiscuous. Kerouac's novels feature an interracial love affair (The Subterraneans), and group sex (The Dharma Bums). The relationships among men in Kerouac's novels are predominately homosocial.

Drug use 
The original members of the Beat Generation used a number of different drugs, including alcohol, marijuana, benzedrine, morphine, and later psychedelic drugs such as peyote, Ayahuasca, and LSD. They often approached drugs experimentally, initially being unfamiliar with their effects. Their drug use was broadly inspired by intellectual interest, and many Beat writers thought that their drug experiences enhanced creativity, insight, or productivity. The use of drugs was a key influence on many of the social events of the time that were personal to the Beat generation.

Romanticism 
Gregory Corso considered English Romantic poet Percy Bysshe Shelley a hero, and he was buried at the foot of Shelley's grave in the Protestant Cemetery, Rome. Ginsberg mentions Shelley's poem Adonais at the beginning of his poem Kaddish, and cites it as a major influence on the composition of one of his most important poems. Michael McClure compared Ginsberg's Howl to Shelley's breakthrough poem Queen Mab.

Ginsberg's main Romantic influence was William Blake, and studied him throughout his life. Blake was the subject of Ginsberg's self-defining auditory hallucination and revelation in 1948. Romantic poet John Keats was also cited as an influence.

Jazz 
Writers of the Beat Generation were heavily influenced by Jazz artists like Billie Holiday and the stories told through Jazz music. Writers like Jack Kerouac (On the Road), Bob Kaufman ("Round About Midnight," "Jazz Chick," and "O-Jazz-O"), and Frank O'Hara ("The Day Lady Died") incorporated the emotions they felt toward Jazz. They used their pieces to discuss feelings, people, and objects they associate with Jazz music, as well as life experiences that reminded them of this style of music. Kaufman's pieces listed above "were intended to be freely improvisational when read with Jazz accompaniment" (Charters 327). He and other writers found inspiration in this genre and allowed it to help fuel the Beat movement.

Early American sources 
The Beats were inspired by early American figures such as Henry David Thoreau, Ralph Waldo Emerson, Herman Melville and especially Walt Whitman, who is addressed as the subject of one of Ginsberg's most famous poems, A Supermarket in California. Edgar Allan Poe was occasionally acknowledged, and Ginsberg saw Emily Dickinson as having an influence on Beat poetry. The 1926 novel You Can't Win by outlaw author Jack Black was cited as having a strong influence on Burroughs.

French surrealism 
In many ways, Surrealism was still considered a vital movement in the 1950s. Carl Solomon introduced the work of French author Antonin Artaud to Ginsberg, and the poetry of André Breton had direct influence on Ginsberg's poem Kaddish. Rexroth, Ferlinghetti, John Ashbery and Ron Padgett translated French poetry. Second-generation Beat Ted Joans was named "the only Afro-American Surrealist" by Breton.

Philip Lamantia introduced Surrealist poetry to the original Beats. The poetry of Gregory Corso and Bob Kaufman shows the influence of Surrealist poetry with its dream-like images and its random juxtaposition of dissociated images, and this influence can also be seen in more subtle ways in Ginsberg's poetry. As the legend goes, when meeting French Surrealist Marcel Duchamp, Ginsberg kissed his shoe and Corso cut off his tie.  Other influential French poets for the Beats were Guillaume Apollinaire, Arthur Rimbaud and Charles Baudelaire.

Modernism 
Gertrude Stein was the subject of a book-length study by Lew Welch. Admitted influences for Kerouac include Marcel Proust, Ernest Hemingway and Thomas Wolfe.

Buddhism and Daoism 
Gary Snyder defined wild as "whose order has grown from within and is maintained by the force of consensus and custom rather than explicit legislation". "The wild is not brute savagery, but a healthy balance, a self-regulating system.". Snyder attributed wild to Buddhism and Daoism, the interests of some Beats. "Snyder's synthesis uses Buddhist thought to encourage American social activism, relying on both the concept of impermanence and the classically American imperative toward freedom."

Topics 
 While many authors claim to be directly influenced by the Beats, the Beat Generation phenomenon itself has had an influence on American culture leading more broadly to the hippie movements of the 1960s.
In 1982, Ginsberg published a summary of "the essential effects" of the Beat Generation:

 Spiritual liberation, sexual "revolution" or "liberation," i.e., gay liberation, somewhat catalyzing women's liberation, black liberation, Gray Panther activism.
 Liberation of the world from censorship.
 Demystification and/or decriminalization of cannabis and other drugs.
 The evolution of rhythm and blues into rock and roll as a high art form, as evidenced by the Beatles, Bob Dylan, Janis Joplin, and other popular musicians influenced in the later fifties and sixties by Beat generation poets' and writers' works.
 The spread of ecological consciousness, emphasized early by Gary Snyder and Michael McClure, the notion of a "Fresh Planet."
 Opposition to the military-industrial machine civilization, as emphasized in writings of Burroughs, Huncke, Ginsberg, and Kerouac.
 Attention to what Kerouac called (after Spengler) a "second religiousness" developing within an advanced civilization.
 Return to an appreciation of idiosyncrasy vs. state regimentation.
 Respect for land and indigenous peoples and creatures, as proclaimed by Kerouac in his slogan from On the Road: "The Earth is an Indian thing."

"Beatniks" 

The term "Beatnik" was coined by Herb Caen of the San Francisco Chronicle on April 2, 1958, blending the name of the recent Russian satellite Sputnik and Beat Generation. This suggested that beatniks were (1) "far out of the mainstream of society" and (2) "possibly pro-Communist." Caen's term stuck and became the popular label associated with a new stereotype—the man with a goatee and beret reciting nonsensical poetry and playing bongo drums while free-spirited women wearing black leotards dance.

An early example of the "beatnik stereotype" occurred in Vesuvio's (a bar in North Beach, San Francisco) which employed the artist Wally Hedrick to sit in the window dressed in full beard, turtleneck, and sandals, creating improvisational drawings and paintings. By 1958 tourists who came to San Francisco could take bus tours to view the North Beach Beat scene, prophetically anticipating similar tours of the Haight-Ashbury district ten years later.

A variety of other small businesses also sprang up exploiting (and/or satirizing) the new craze. In 1959, Fred McDarrah started a "Rent-a-Beatnik" service in New York, taking out ads in The Village Voice and sending Ted Joans and friends out on calls to read poetry.

"Beatniks" appeared in many cartoons, movies, and TV shows of the time, perhaps the most famous being the character Maynard G. Krebs in The Many Loves of Dobie Gillis (1959–1963).

While some of the original Beats embraced the beatniks, or at least found the parodies humorous (Ginsberg, for example, appreciated the parody in the comic strip Pogo) others criticized the beatniks as inauthentic poseurs. Jack Kerouac feared that the spiritual aspect of his message had been lost and that many were using the Beat Generation as an excuse to be senselessly wild.

"Hippies" 

During the 1960s, aspects of the Beat movement metamorphosed into the counterculture of the 1960s, accompanied by a shift in terminology from "beatnik" to "hippie". Many of the original Beats remained active participants, notably Allen Ginsberg, who became a fixture of the anti-war movement. Notably, however, Jack Kerouac broke with Ginsberg and criticized the 1960s politically radical protest movements as an excuse to be "spiteful".

There were stylistic differences between beatniks and hippies—somber colors, dark sunglasses, and goatees gave way to colorful psychedelic clothing and long hair. The Beats were known for "playing it cool" (keeping a low profile).

Beyond style, there were changes in substance: The Beats tended to be essentially apolitical, but the hippies became actively engaged with the civil rights movement and the anti-war movement.

Literary legacy 
Among the emerging novelists of the 1960s and 1970s, a few were closely connected with Beat writers, most notably Ken Kesey (One Flew Over the Cuckoo's Nest). Though they had no direct connection, other writers considered the Beats to be a major influence, including Thomas Pynchon (Gravity's Rainbow) and Tom Robbins (Even Cowgirls Get the Blues).

William S. Burroughs is considered a forefather of postmodern literature; he also inspired the cyberpunk genre.

One-time Beat writer LeRoi Jones/Amiri Baraka helped initiate the Black Arts movement.

As there was focus on live performance among the Beats, many Slam poets have claimed to be influenced by the Beats. Saul Williams, for example, cites Allen Ginsberg, Amiri Baraka, and Bob Kaufman as major influences.

The Postbeat Poets are direct descendants of the Beat Generation. Their association with or tutelage under Ginsberg at The Naropa University's Jack Kerouac School of Disembodied Poetics and later at Brooklyn College stressed the social-activist legacy of the Beats and created its own body of literature. Known authors are Anne Waldman, Antler, Andy Clausen, David Cope, Eileen Myles, Eliot Katz, Paul Beatty, Sapphire, Lesléa Newman, Jim Cohn, Thomas R. Peters, Jr. (poet and owner of beat book shop), Sharon Mesmer, Randy Roark, Josh Smith, David Evans.

Rock and pop music 
The Beats had a pervasive influence on rock and roll and popular music, including the Beatles, Bob Dylan and Jim Morrison. The Beatles spelled their name with an "a" partly as a Beat Generation reference, and John Lennon was a fan of Jack Kerouac. The Beatles even put Beat writer William S. Burroughs on the cover of their album Sgt. Pepper's Lonely Hearts Club Band. Ginsberg later met and became friends of members of the Beatles, and Paul McCartney played the drums, guitar, Hammond organ, and maracas on Ginsberg's album Ballad of the Skeletons.

Ginsberg was a close friend of Bob Dylan and toured with him on the Rolling Thunder Revue in 1975. Dylan cites Ginsberg and Kerouac as major influences.

Jim Morrison cites Kerouac as one of his biggest influences, and fellow Doors member Ray Manzarek has said "We wanted to be beatniks." In his book Light My Fire: My Life with The Doors, Manzarek also writes "I suppose if Jack Kerouac had never written On the Road, The Doors would never have existed." Michael McClure was also a friend of members of The Doors, at one point touring with Manzarek.

Ginsberg was a friend of Ken Kesey's Merry Pranksters, a group of which Neal Cassady was a member, which also included members of the Grateful Dead. In the 1970s, Burroughs was a friend of Mick Jagger, Lou Reed, David Bowie, and Patti Smith.

The musical group Steely Dan is named after a steam-powered dildo in Burroughs' Naked Lunch. British progressive rock band Soft Machine is named after Burroughs' novel The Soft Machine.

Singer-songwriter Tom Waits, a Beat fan, wrote "Jack and Neal" about Kerouac and Cassady, and recorded "On the Road" (a song written by Kerouac after finishing the novel) with Primus. He later collaborated with Burroughs on the theatrical work The Black Rider.

Jazz musician/film composer Robert Kraft wrote and released a contemporary homage to Jack Kerouac and Beat Generation aesthetics entitled "Beat Generation" on the 1988 album Quake City.

Musician Mark Sandman, who was the bass guitarist, lead vocalist and a former member of the alternative jazz rock band Morphine, was interested in the Beat Generation and wrote a song called "Kerouac" as a tribute to Jack Kerouac and his personal philosophy and way of life.

The band Aztec Two-Step recorded "The Persecution & Restoration of Dean Moriarty (On the Road)" in 1972.

There was a resurgence of interest in the beats among bands in the 1980s. Ginsberg worked with the Clash and Burroughs worked with Sonic Youth, R.E.M., Kurt Cobain, and Ministry, among others. Bono of U2 cites Burroughs as a major influence, and Burroughs appeared briefly in a U2 video in 1997. Post-punk band Joy Division named a song "Interzone" after a collection of stories by Burroughs. Laurie Anderson featured Burroughs on her 1984 album Mister Heartbreak and in her 1986 concert film, Home of the Brave. The band King Crimson produced the album Beat inspired by the Beat Generation.

More recently, American artist Lana Del Rey references the Beat movement and Beat poetry in her 2014 song "Brooklyn Baby".

In 2021, rapper R.A.P. Ferreria released the album Bob's Son: R.A.P. Ferreira in the Garden Level Cafe of the Scallops Hotel, named for Bob Kaufman and containing many references to the work of Kaufman, Jack Kerouac, Amiri Baraka, and other beat poets.

Criticism 
The Beat Generation was met with scrutiny and assigned many stereotypes. Several magazines, including Life and Playboy, depicted members of the Beat Generation as nihilists and as unintellectual. This criticism was largely due to the ideological differences between American culture at the time and the Beat Generation, including their Buddhist-inspired beliefs.

Norman Podhoretz, a student at Columbia with Kerouac and Ginsberg, later became a critic of the Beats. His 1958 Partisan Review article "The Know-Nothing Bohemians" was a vehement critique primarily of Kerouac's On the Road and The Subterraneans, as well as Ginsberg's Howl. His central criticism is that the Beat embrace of spontaneity is bound up in an anti-intellectual worship of the "primitive" that can easily turn toward mindlessness and violence. Podhoretz asserted that there was a link between the Beats and criminal delinquents.

Ginsberg responded in a 1958 interview with The Village Voice, specifically addressing the charge that the Beats destroyed "the distinction between life and literature". In the interview, he stated that "the bit about anti-intellectualism is a piece of vanity, we had the same education, went to the same school, you know there are 'Intellectuals' and there are intellectuals. Podhoretz is just out of touch with twentieth-century literature, he's writing for the eighteenth-century mind. We have a personal literature now—Proust, Wolfe, Faulkner, Joyce."

Internal criticism 
In a 1974 interview, Gary Snyder comments on the subject of "casualties" of the Beat Generation:

Kerouac was a casualty too. And there were many other casualties that most people have never heard of, but were genuine casualties. Just as, in the 60s, when Allen and I for a period there were almost publicly recommending people to take acid. When I look back on that now I realize there were many casualties, responsibilities to bear.

When the Beats initially set out to "construct" new communities that shirked conformity and traditionalism, they invoked the symbols of the most marginalized ethnic identities of their time. As the reality set in, of racial self-identity lost within the communal constructs of their own making, most of the Beat writers altered their message drastically to acknowledge the social impulse to marginalize the self in the conflict between isolationism and absorption of self by communal instincts seeking belonging. They began to deeply engage with new themes such as the place of the white man in America and declining patriarchal institutions.

Quotes

Films 

 D.O.A. (1949) — a film noir, set in San Francisco, which includes one of the earliest (fictional) depictions of the Beat culture
Jack Kerouac (wrote), Robert Frank and Alfred Leslie (directed) Pull My Daisy (1958)
Bell, Book and Candle* (1958) (motion picture)
The Beat Generation* (1959) (motion picture)
A Bucket of Blood* (1959) Roger Corman Production
The Subterraneans* (1960) (motion picture)
Visit to a Small Planet (1960) (motion picture)
Greenwich Village Story* (1961)
Next Stop, Greenwich Village* (1976)
Heart Beat (1980) (motion picture)
What Happened to Kerouac? (1986) (documentary)
Absolute Beginners (1986) (motion picture)
Naked Lunch (1991) (motion picture)
Life and Times of Allen Ginsberg (1993) (documentary)
So I Married an Axe Murderer (1993) (motion picture)
Allen Ginsberg Live in London (1995) (documentary)
The Last Time I Committed Suicide (1997)
The Source (1999) (documentary)
Beat (2000) (motion picture)
American Saint (2001) (dramatic motion picture)
Words of Advice: William S. Burroughs on the Road (2007)
Neal Cassady* (2007)

Crazy Wisdom: The Jack Kerouac School of Disembodied Poetics (2008) (documentary)
Howl (2010) (motion picture)
William S. Burroughs: A Man Within (2010) (documentary)
Magic Trip (2011) (documentary)
Big Sur (2012) (motion picture)
Corso: The Last Beat (2012) (documentary)
On the Road (2012) (motion picture)
The Beat Hotel (2012)  (documentary)
Kill Your Darlings (2013) (motion picture)
 Ferlinghetti: A Rebirth of Wonder (2013) (documentary)
Inside Llewyn Davis (2013) (motion picture)

See also 
Beat Scene
Beatnik
Beatdom Literary Journal
European Beat Studies Network (EBSN)
Literary Kicks
San Francisco Oracle
Leonard Cohen, Canadian Beat Generation poet & songwriter
Christopher Felver
Silent Generation
Generation gap

References

Sources 
 Charters, Ann (ed.) (1992) The Portable Beat Reader. Penguin Books.  (hc);  (pbk). The table of contents is online.
 Charters, Ann (ed.) (2001) Beat Down to Your Soul: What Was the Beat Generation? NY: Penguin, 2001. 
 Knight, Arthur Winfield. Ed. The Beat Vision (1987) Paragon House. ;  (pbk)
 Knight, Brenda. Women of the Beat Generation: The Writers, Artists and Muses at the Heart of a Revolution. 
 McClure, Michael. Scratching the Beat Surface: Essays on New Vision from Blake to Kerouac. Penguin, 1994. 
 Miles, Barry (2001). Ginsberg: A Biography. London: Virgin Publishing Ltd., paperback, 628 pages, 
 Morgan, Ted (1983) Literary Outlaw The Life and Times of William S. Burroughs. , first printing, trade paperback edition Avon, NY, NY
 Phillips, Lisa. Beat Culture and the New America 1950–1965 published by the Whitney Museum of American Art in accordance with an exhibition in 1995/1996.  softcover.  hardcover (Flammarion)
 Raskin, Jonah. American Scream: Allen Ginsberg's "Howl" and the Making of the Beat Generation. University of California Press, 2004. 
 Starer, Jacqueline. Les écrivains de la Beat Generation éditions d'écarts Dol de Bretagne France. 1SBN 978-2-919121-02-1
 Weidner, Chad. The Green Ghost: William Burroughs and the Ecological Mind. Carbondale, IL: Southern Illinois University Press, 2016. 1SBN 978-0809334865

Further reading

Books 
Campbell, James. This Is the Beat Generation: New York–San Francisco-Paris. LA: University of California Press, 2001. 
Chandarlapaty, Raj. Seeing the Beat Generation. Jefferson, NC: McFarland & Company, 2019. 
 Collins, Ronald & Skover, David. Mania: The Story of the Outraged & Outrageous Lives that Launched a Cultural Revolution (Top-Five Books, March 2013)
Cook, Bruce The Beat Generation: The tumultuous '50s movement and its impact on today. New York: Charles Scribner's Sons, 1971. .
Gifford, Barry and Lawrence Lee Jack's Book An Oral Biography Of Jack Kerouac, New York: St. Martin's Press, 1978. 
Gorski, Hedwig. *  Robert Creeley 1982 TV Interview with Hedwig Gorski transcript included in special Robert Creeley Issue, Journal of American Studies of Turkey (JAST), No. 27, Spring 2008.
Grace, Nancy Jack Kerouac and the Literary Imagination, New York: Palgrave Macmillan, 2007. 
Hemmer, Kurt (ed.). Encyclopedia of Beat Literature. Facts on File, 2006. 
Hrebeniak, Michael. Action Writing: Jack Kerouac's Wild Form, Carbondale, IL: Southern Illinois University Press, 2006.
Johnson, Ronna C. and Nancy Grace. Girls Who Wore Black: Women Writing the Beat Generation. Rutgers, 2002. 
Knight, Brenda. Women of the Beat Generation; The Writers, Artists, and Muses at the Heart of a Revolution. Conari Press, 1996.  
McDarrah, Fred W., and Gloria S. McDarrah. Beat Generation: Glory Days in Greenwich Village Schirmer Books (September 1996) 
McNally, Dennis. Desolate Angel: Jack Kerouac, the Beat Generation, and America. NY: DeCapo, 2003. 
Miles, Barry. The Beat Hotel: Ginsberg, Burroughs & Corso in Paris, 1957–1963. NY: Grove Press, 2001. 
Peabody, Richard. A Different Beat: Writing by Women of the Beat Generation. Serpent's Tail, 1997.  / 
Sargeant, Jack. Naked Lens: Beat Cinema. NY: Soft Skull, 2009 (third edition)
Sanders, Ed. Tales of Beatnik Glory (second edition, 1990) 
Theado, Matt (ed.). The Beats: A Literary Reference. NY: Carrol & Graff, 2002. 
Watson, Steven. The Birth of the Beat Generation: Visionaries, Rebels, and Hipsters, 1944–1960. NY: Pantheon, 1998.

Archival resources 
 Gregory Corso Papers, 1981–1990 (1.5 linear feet) are housed at the Stanford University Libraries
 Lawrence Ferlinghetti Papers, 1919–2003 (circa 28 linear feet) are housed at the Bancroft Library, University of California, Berkeley
 Photographs from the Lawrence Ferlinghetti Papers, circa 1935-circa 1990 (circa 345 photographs) are housed at the University of California at Berkeley Bancroft Library.
 Allen Ginsberg Papers, 1937–1994 (circa 1,000 linear feet) are housed at Stanford University Libraries
 Jack Kerouac Papers, 1920–1977, bulk (1935–1969) (22.5 linear feet) are housed at the New York Public Library Henry W. and Albert A. Berg Collection of English and American Literature.
 Finding aid to Beat poets and poetry collection at Columbia University. Rare Book & Manuscript Library.

External links 

Biographies of Beat Generation writers, artists, & poets
Beat Poetry, Broadsides and Little Magazines Digital Collection: Utah State University

 
20th-century American literature
American literary movements
Cultural generations
Literary circles
Culture of Columbia University
History of Columbia University
North Beach, San Francisco
Obscenity controversies in literature
1940s neologisms
Counterculture communities